Wenman can refer to:

Viscount Wenman, noble title
People
Charles Wenman (born 1797), English cricketer who played for Kent
Charles Wenman (theatre) (c. 1876–1954), Australian theatre manager and producer
Diana Wenman, American television director and editor
Francis Wenman (1599–1640), English politician
Henry Wenman (1875–1953), British actor
John Wenman (1803–1877), English cricketer, cousin of Ned
Ned Wenman (1803–1879), English cricketer
Richard Wenman (disambiguation), several people:
Richard Wenman (MP for Northampton) (1524-73), MP for Northampton (UK Parliament constituency)
Richard Wenman, 1st Viscount Wenman (1573–1640), English landowner, MP for Oxfordshire
Richard Wenman, 4th Viscount Wenman (1657–1690), English landowner, MP for Brackley and Oxfordshire
Richard Wenman, 5th Viscount Wenman (1688–1729), English landowner, Viscount Wenman
Richard Wenman (Nova Scotia politician) (c. 1712–1781), Nova Scotia merchant and politician
Robert Wenman (1940–1995), Canadian politician
Thomas Wenman (c. 1548—1577), English parliamentarian
William Wenman (1832–1921), English cricketer, son of Ned
Places
Wenman Island is another name for Wolf Island, one of the Galapagos Islands.